Joe's Diner may refer to 

 Joe's Diner (TV series), a sequence of TV shorts created by and aired on the NFL Network
 Joe's Diner (placeholder name), a placeholder name for a fictional or hypothetical everyman's restaurant